Jaan Manitski (born 7 March 1942 in Viinistu) is an Estonian businessman, politician and art collector. He served as the Minister of Foreign Affairs of Estonia in 1992.

Biography
Manistki was born in Viinistu, on the coast of the Gulf of Finland. He and his parents escaped to Finland and then to Sweden in 1943 when he was only one and a half years old. Jaan was ABBAs financial manager. He lived in exile while Estonia was under Soviet control, returning in 1989 after the country gained its independence.

He worked as a mushroom farmer before becoming foreign minister in 1992. He later became part-owner of the daily newspaper Eesti Päevaleht, and opened the Viinistu Art Museum in 2003.

References

1942 births
Living people
Ministers of Foreign Affairs of Estonia
People from Kuusalu Parish
Estonian emigrants to Sweden
Estonian World War II refugees
Recipients of the Order of the White Star, 4th Class